KSPK-FM (102.3 FM) is a radio station broadcasting a Country format. Licensed to Walsenburg, Colorado, United States, the station is currently owned by Mainstreet Broadcasting Company, Inc. and features its own programming. KSPK-FM is not affiliated with any mainstream broadcasting company, and touts itself as being one of the few locally owned and operated radio stations left in Southern Colorado.
In addition to the main station, KSPK-FM is simulcast on KSBK 100.3FM in Alamosa and is carried on five translators:
 K281CU 104.1 FM Del Norte, Colorado
 K281BI 104.1 FM Trinidad, Colorado 
 K281BC 104.1 FM Alamosa, Colorado 
 K262AQ 100.3 FM Colorado Springs, Colorado
 K269GQ 101.7 FM Raton, New Mexico

References

External links
 
 

SPK-FM
Radio stations established in 1984